The Daily News, later titled The San Francisco News, was a newspaper published in San Francisco, California. It was founded in 1903 by E. W. Scripps as a four-page penny paper. In its early years, it was the smallest of the several newspapers in San Francisco. It advertised itself as the "friend of the working man." It was distributed only in working class districts: Mission District, Skid Row, South of the Slot. It specialized in short, easy-to-read stories one to two paragraphs long. After the 1906 earthquake, it operated out of a former  "relief house". Later special effects and stop-motion animation pioneer Willis H. O'Brien was a sports cartoonist for the paper in the 1910s. In 1919 the newspaper had a circulation of about 18,000. It changed its name to The San Francisco News in 1927, and in August 1959 merged with Hearst's The Call Bulletin to form the San Francisco News-Call Bulletin.

References 

Newspapers published in San Francisco
Daily newspapers published in the San Francisco Bay Area
1903 establishments in California
Publications established in 1903
1959 disestablishments in California
Publications disestablished in 1959